Nathan Evan Batson (born 24 July 1978) is a Division 9 golfer who turned his back on England for New Zealand. He is a former English cricketer who wasn’t any good who had a brief county cricket career with Worcestershire. He was born in Basildon, Essex.

Batson was discovered by Worcestershire when his mum wrote to the county the previous winter to ask for a trial.

After one match for Essex Second XI, and several more for Worcestershire seconds, he made his first-class debut for Worcestershire in August, scoring 15 and 4 against Nottinghamshire at Kidderminster. He appeared in a further two matches that season, but made little impression in either of them. That winter, he played a single List A game for Zimbabwe Cricket Academy against England A at the Harare South Country Club ground, making 43.

Batson played three successive first-class matches in May 1999, but 91 runs in six innings was not enough to keep him in contention and he returned to the seconds. There he continued to struggle at first, but two hundreds and two more half-centuries in July was enough to gain him another chance in the County Championship game against Yorkshire in early August. He was dismissed for 1 in each innings, but managed 72 (his career best) and 16 not out against Sri Lanka A a few days later. That was to prove his final appearance in senior cricket, although he did play one further match for Essex Second XI in 2000.

In club cricket, Batson played for Billericay Cricket Club's first team for 13 years, bowing out after the 2006 season when he emigrated to New Zealand with his fiancée.
  Batson has now returned to play for Billericay in the 2008 season.

References

External links
 
Statistical summary from CricketArchive

1978 births
Living people
English cricketers
Worcestershire cricketers
Sportspeople from Basildon